The Khengkha language (Dzongkha ྨཕགལཔམཕ), or Kheng, is an East Bodish language spoken by ~40,000 native speakers worldwide, in the Zhemgang, Trongsa, and Mongar districts of south–central Bhutan.

Classification
Khengkha is a dialect found in the small Himalayan kingdom of Bhutan. Khengkha is part of the larger branch of Sino-Tibetan language family but falls into the subcategories of: Tibetio-Burman, Western Tubeto-Burman, Bodish, East Bodish, Bumthang, and Khengkha.

Geographical distribution
Khengkha is an East Bodish language spoken in the south-central districts of Bhutan. Khengkha is mainly found in the Sarpang district but can also be found in southwest Mongar district, rural areas in southeast Trongsa district and in Zhemgang district.

Dialects
The three main dialects in Bumthang district are Bumthap (Lower Kheng), Khempa (Middle Kheng), and
Kurtop (Upper Kheng). Comprehension between the three dialects differs as Bumthap is the most similarly
related language, however conversation with Kurthop is difficult.

Phonology

Consonants 

 /r/ can be heard as either a trill [r] or an approximant [ɹ] in free variation.
 Alveolo-palatal sounds /tɕ, tɕʰ, dʑ, ɕ, ʑ/ can also range to palato-alveolar sounds [tʃ, tʃʰ, dʒ, ʃ, ʒ] in free variation.

Vowels 

 A centralized rounded [ø̈] does appear, but is mostly borrowed from words in Dzongkha.
 /a/ can appear slightly back as [ʌ] or [ɑ] within diphthongs or codas.
 /i, e/ can be heard as [ɪ, ɛ] when in short form.

Grammar
In most Khengkha sentences, it only marks grammatical relations through word order. The subject constituent precedes the object and the verb constituents follow it. Khengkha follows the same typology as Dzongkha. The example below demonstrates how the grammatical roles of each constituent are marked only by the position relative to the verb:

When nouns are addressed in Khengkha there are two ways it can be written, depending on the other.

 Relatives before noun heads or articles.
 Adjectives after noun heads.

Khengkha is an oral language without a writing system, making tones and nuances important during communication.

Language Use 
Khengkha is a vigorous language in limited areas. Khengkha is not allowed to be taught in schools around Bhutan, making it only spoken at home, for commerce, local politics, and traditional religion. Due to the increasing modernization of Bhutan, there are negative attitudes towards those who speak Kheng instead of Dzongkha or the English. Lower Kheng is considered to be spoken backward, while Middle Kheng is seen as more prestigious.  Middle Kheng region is the strongest and most developed economically, while lower Kheng is least developed.

Language Development 
Since Khengkha is an oral language there is a low literacy rate for native Khengkha speakers in Dzongkha. There is literacy rate of 20% in Dzongkha.

Common phrases

As there is no official English romanization of Dzongkha script, many words are spelled out phonetically. Therefore, there may be multiple spellings of the same word.

English translation of the conversation:

Dorji: Hi, my name is Dorji.

Sonam: Hi, my name is Sonam. Where are you from?

Dorji: I’m from Zhemgang.

Sonam: What are you doing nowadays?

Dorji: I’m studying.

Sonam: I’m happy to meet you.

Dorji: I’m also happy to meet you. Let’s meet again.

Sonam: Okay.

Numerical
Khengkha counting system is written in Dzongkha script but pronounced differently. Below is a comparison of Khengkha and Dzongkha numbers.

Below are audio records of Khengkha and Dzongkha numbers being spoken.
 Khengkha numbers: #REDIRECT 
 Dzongkha numbers: #REDIRECT

Writing system
Khengkha is an oral language without its own written system. But it unofficially borrows from the Tibetan
script and Uchen style of writing. Khengkha and Dzongkha numerical script are written the same.

Related languages
Historically, Kheng and its speakers have had close contact with speakers of the Kurtöp, Nupbi and Bumthang languages, nearby languages of central and eastern Bhutan, to the extent that they may be considered part of a wider collection of "Bumthang languages".

See also
Languages of Bhutan
Kheng people

References

Bibliography

External links 
 Himalayan Languages Project

Languages of Bhutan
East Bodish languages